Alessia De Gasperis (born 17 March 1990), formerly known as Kai (also stylized as kai), is a Canadian singer-songwriter from Toronto, Ontario. Best known for her collaborations, she co-wrote and was featured on Flume's Grammy-nominated "Never Be like You", Diplo's "Revolution", and "Mind" from by Jack Ü's Grammy award-winning 2015 album.

Early life and education
Alessia De Gasperis-Brigante attended Bishop Strachan School, notable for its various alumni, including actress Laurie Holden. She is the granddaughter of deceased Italian-Canadian billionaire Alfredo De Gasperis.

Kai derives her name from the Japanese word kai, which means 'change'. She claims to be something new in music and she only wants "to relate [and] share her stories with her fans and anyone who will lend their ear."

On 2 April 2021, she said the following on social media: "Kai was part of me I felt safe in sharing. An aspect of me. But I'm ready to be all of me now. Change is good when it's coming from truth. Allow me to introduce myself: My name is Alessia De Gasperis and I look forward to our friendship and journey together and I'm grateful for your love and support always and forever, ADG (Alessia De Gasperis)"

Career

Early career
In 2011, Kai released her debut extended play, 11:11, which included her debut single "I Choose Me", which is frequently used in campaigns for First Choice Haircutters. The EP received minimal promotion and did not chart.

In 2012, Kai collaborated with Montreal dubstep group Adventure Club on the track "Need Your Heart", which features Kai's vocals and writing. The song has been remixed by several artists, including Minnesota, Crywolf, and Candyland. The track peaked at number 2 on the iTunes Electronic music chart.

Breakthrough
Kai collaborated with Diplo on his EP Revolution, co-writing and appearing on the title track "Revolution". She lent her vocals to the track "Crawl" by Childish Gambino for his second studio album, Because the Internet.

In 2014, Kai wrote "Sweet Talker", which was produced by Diplo, the title track from Jessie J's third studio album of the same name which was released in October 2014. She stated that she wrote the song with Rihanna in mind. She wrote and was featured on the track "Mind" on the 2015 debut album of Jack Ü, a collaborative project of Skrillex and Diplo.

In 2016, Kai wrote and was featured on the track "Never Be Like You" by Australian electronic musician Flume. It reached number one in Australia and the top 20 in the United States, as well as becoming an international hit and her first song to top the iTunes Electronic music chart.

Discography

Albums

Extended plays

Singles

As featured artist

Other featured in
 2013: "Revolution" (Diplo feat. Faustix, ImanoS & Kai)
 2015: "Mind" (Jack Ü feat. Kai), RIAA: Gold
 2015: "Let Me Love You Right" (Hunter Siegel feat. Kai)

Awards and nominations

References

1990 births
APRA Award winners
ARIA Award winners
Living people
Canadian women pop singers
Musicians from Toronto
21st-century Canadian women singers
Canadian people of Italian descent